Wayne Township is a township in Lawrence County, Pennsylvania, United States. The population was 2,468 at the 2020 census, a decline from the figure of 2,606 tabulated in 2010.

History
The township was linked to New Castle, Ellwood City and Pittsburgh in 1908 by the Pittsburgh, Harmony, Butler and New Castle Railway, an interurban trolley line. The line closed on 15 June 1931, and the trolleys were replaced by buses.

Geography
Unincorporated communities in the township include Chewton, Rock Point, and Park Gate.

Recreation
Recreational areas of Wayne County include McConnells Mill State Park and Pennsylvania State Game Lands Number 148.

Demographics
As of the census of 2000, there were 2,328 people, 894 households, and 680 families residing in the township.  The population density was 144.4 people per square mile (55.8/km).  There were 946 housing units at an average density of 58.7/sq mi (22.7/km).  The racial makeup of the township was 98.54% White, 0.39% African American, 0.17% Native American, 0.26% Asian, and 0.64% from two or more races. Hispanic or Latino of any race were 0.52% of the population.

There were 894 households, out of which 30.6% had children under the age of 18 living with them, 62.9% were married couples living together, 7.5% had a female householder with no husband present, and 23.9% were non-families. 20.7% of all households were made up of individuals, and 11.6% had someone living alone who was 65 years of age or older.  The average household size was 2.59 and the average family size was 3.00.

In the township the population was spread out, with 23.1% under the age of 18, 7.0% from 18 to 24, 27.6% from 25 to 44, 25.9% from 45 to 64, and 16.4% who were 65 years of age or older.  The median age was 41 years. For every 100 females, there were 99.5 males.  For every 100 females age 18 and over, there were 97.8 males.

The median income for a household in the township was $39,594, and the median income for a family was $47,452. Males had a median income of $34,853 versus $21,544 for females. The per capita income for the township was $19,011.  About 4.1% of families and 7.0% of the population were below the poverty line, including 9.1% of those under age 18 and 3.9% of those age 65 or over.

References

External links

Populated places established in 1796
Townships in Lawrence County, Pennsylvania
Townships in Pennsylvania
1796 establishments in Pennsylvania